Cornelia "Conny" Hütter (born 29 October 1992) is a World Cup alpine ski racer from Austria.

Born in Graz, Styria, Hütter made her World Cup debut in November 2011 in Lake Louise, Canada. She attained her first World Cup podium in December 2013, a third place in downhill at Val-d'Isère, France.

A difficult knee injury caused Hütter to miss the 2020 and 2021 seasons almost entirely. During the 2022 season, she returned to the World Cup circuit in good form with a victory and two additional podiums, and represented Austria in the Winter Olympics for a third time in 2022.

In the 2023 World Championships in Courchevel-Méribel, Hütter won her first World Championships medal, a bronze in the Super-G. She shared the bronze placement with Norway's Kajsa Vickhoff Lie, the two having skied the exact same mark of 1:28,39.

World Cup results

Season standings

Race podiums
 4 wins – (1 DH, 3 SG)
 21 podiums – (12 DH, 9 SG)

World Championship results

Olympic results

References

External links
 
 
 

1992 births
Living people
Sportspeople from Graz
Austrian female alpine skiers
Alpine skiers at the 2014 Winter Olympics
Alpine skiers at the 2018 Winter Olympics
Alpine skiers at the 2022 Winter Olympics
Olympic alpine skiers of Austria
20th-century Austrian women
21st-century Austrian women